Giant City State Park is an Illinois state park on  in Jackson and Union Counties, Illinois, United States. A lodge and visitor center welcome state park guests.

Giant City State Park is a haven for nature lovers. It is a popular destination in Southern Illinois, and visitors to the park enjoy a number of activities such as hiking, horseback riding, picnicking, and rock climbing. Some of the park's most popular hiking trails include Giant City Nature Trail, Red Cedar Trail, and Trillium Trail.
The park is served by the River to River Trail.

The park's lodge and original six cabins were constructed by the 696th Company of the Civilian Conservation Corps from 1934 to 1935. The CCC used locally quarried sandstone and locally harvested lumber to build the lodge. In 1936, the lodge and cabins were dedicated by Illinois Governor Henry Horner. The CCC later added a dining room and kitchen as well as six additional cabins to the complex. They were also responsible for building the lodge's furniture; the quality of the wooden furniture led Pere Marquette State Park to commission the 696th Company to furnish their lodge as well. In 1985, the lodge and cabins were added to the National Register of Historic Places; the original cabins were demolished and replaced by replica cabins in the same year, and several new cabins were constructed. The new cabins are used to lodge visitors to the park, while the lodge houses a restaurant and gift shop.

This state park is a National Natural Landmark. The Giant City Stone Fort Site, a prehistoric stone fort located within the park, is listed on the National Register of Historic Places.

References

External links

State parks of Illinois
Protected areas of Jackson County, Illinois
Protected areas of Union County, Illinois
Protected areas established in 1927
Park buildings and structures on the National Register of Historic Places in Illinois
National Register of Historic Places in Union County, Illinois
1927 establishments in Illinois
National Natural Landmarks in Illinois